is a Japanese manga series written and illustrated by Kore Yamazaki. It was serialized in Kodansha's josei manga magazine Itan from October 2014 to December 2017.

Publication
Fraut Faust is written and illustrated by Kore Yamazaki. The manga was serialized in Kodansha's josei manga magazine Itan from October 7, 2014 to December 7, 2017. Kodansha collected its chapters in five tankōbon volumes, released from April 7, 2015 to March 7, 2018.

In North America, the manga was licensed for English release by Kodansha USA. The five volumes were released from September 26, 2017 to November 6, 2018.

Volume list

Reception
In 2020, Frau Faust was one of the manga titles that ranked on the "Top 10 Graphic Novels for Teens" by the Young Adult Library Services Association (YALSA) of the American Library Association.

References

Further reading

External links
  
 

Dark fantasy anime and manga
Josei manga
Kodansha manga
Works based on Goethe's Faust
Works based on the Faust legend